Sebastian Ioan Burduja (born June 18, 1985, Bucharest, Romania) is a Romanian politician. He is the vice-president of the National Liberal Party (PNL) and the president of the PNL branch Sector 1 – Bucharest. In December 2020, he was elected deputy of the National Party in the 42nd constituency of Bucharest. Since May 3, 2022, he holds the position of Minister of Research, Innovation and Digitalization in Ciucă Cabinet. He was until August 2019 the president and founder of the Youth Civic Action Platform (PACT) party, launched in January 2016. He founded and led the League of Romanian Students Abroad (LSRS) and the CAESAR Foundation (Center for Access to the Expertise of Romanian Students and Graduates).

Career
He did internships at the United Nations (UN) – Economic Commission for Europe, in Geneva, at the consulting firm McKinsey & Company, in Bucharest, as well as at the Ministry of Foreign Affairs – NATO Division, at National Endowment for Democracy (Washington DC) and the Freeman Spogli Institute for International Studies (Stanford CA), where he worked as an assistant to the renowned political analyst, Prof. Dr. Larry Diamond. At Harvard, he collaborated with, among others, professors Steve Jarding⁠ and David Gergen⁠.

Between 2011 and 2012, he was a consultant for Dalberg Global Development Advisors, a strategic advisory company that develops country strategies and high-level development projects for emerging countries, in partnership with organizations such as the G20, the World Bank, the United Nations, etc.

From 2012 to 2015, he worked as a development specialist at the World Bank, headquartered in Washington D.C., coordinating projects for the Europe and Central Asia region, including Romania. He was the main author or co-author of 22 technical reports for Romania. He gave a presentation at the World Bank on "Reshaping the Economic Geography of Romania".

In April 2016, he was elected president of the Youth Civic Action Platform (PACT) party. PACT has been noted for several new projects, including: The Citizens' Pact, the candidez.eu platform for supporting all independent candidates and contesting candidates in local elections of candidates suspected of defrauding lists of supporters. The party nominated 100 candidates in the June 2016 local elections.

He is one of the main promoters of the August 10 #diasporaacasa protest. In June 2018, he registers with his mobile phone at Otopeni airport and tells his story of returning home after the years spent in the United States of America, with the call to the diaspora to come to Bucharest on August 10. The video went viral, reaching over 1.5 million Romanians. Moise Guran credits him with the merit of spreading the idea of ​​a diaspora protest in Romania.

On the occasion of the Centenary of the Great Union, he inaugurates in Alba Iulia the monument of the Time Capsule "Romania 2118", which brings together 200 messages for the future from personalities of the present: located in the ditches of Alba Carolina Citadel, on the side of the Union Bridge, near the two Cathedrals and the Union Monument. Among the authors of the letters that will be opened on December 1, 2118, are: Alexandru Tomescu, Moise Guran, Cristi Danileț, Cristian Pârvulescu, Petre Crăciun, Constantin Necula, Nicu Alifantis, Nicu Covaci, Mihai Covaliu, Marcel Iureș, Lucian Mîndruță, Lazăr Comănescu, Laura Badea, Ivan Patzaichin, Ion Caramitru, Ioan-Aurel Pop, Eugen Doga, Felicia Filip, Elisabeta Lipă, etc.

In January 2019, as a result of his civic and political activity, Sebastian Burduja is selected by the German Friedrich Naumann Foundation as "one of the six freedom fighters in Eastern Europe, within the Think Freedom project, and his story is translated into a short documentary.

In August 2019, within the National Council of the National Liberal Party, he was elected PNL Vice President at the national level. He is also appointed interim president of the PNL Sector 1 branch. He will hold this political position until February 2020, when he will be elected President with full rights.

He was selected by Forbes magazine in the first "30 under 30" promotion in Romania.

In January 2017 he becomes Managing Partner within the company RISE Consortium and remains in that position until December 2019.

In December 2019, he was appointed Secretary of State in the Ministry of Public Finance.

In 2020, he published the book Plan for Romania: 7 intellectual revolutions for a country we want to stay in, at Litera publishing house.

With the general elections organized in December 2020, he becomes a deputy of Bucharest, a position he currently holds.

Education
In Romania, he graduated from the Mihai Viteazul National College in Bucharest. He is a graduate and head of promotion of School No. 11 Ion Heliade Rădulescu.

He graduated from the Stanford University in the United States,as member of the Phi Beta Kappa Society⁠ with a major in Politics and sub-specializations in Economy and Sociology. The graduation average placed him in the top 15% of his promotion and he also received the grade "honors" given following the recommendation of the specialized departments for their own advanced level work.

From 2008 to 2011, he continued his studies at Harvard University, being a David Rubenstein⁠'s fellow and graduating in parallel with two master's programs: MBA from Harvard Business School and MPP from Harvard Kennedy School of Government. He was honored in 2009 and 2010 with outstanding academic achievement, including the "First Year Honors" and "Second Year Honors" awards given to the best students at Harvard Business School.

In 2016, he became a doctoral student at the Academy of Economic Studies and, in 2019, he obtained the title of Doctor of Economics and International Affairs with the qualification "Summa Cum Laude".

Published articles and papers
He has published articles in specialized journals in the United States, focusing in particular on the topic of democracy in Romania and the need to strengthen it. In 2016 he published at Editura Curtea Veche the book "Between hope and disappointment. Democracy and anti-corruption in Post-Communist Romania", which presents "in its own vision the post-communist course of Romanian democracy, having as reference point the aspect that represented – in my personal opinion – the main obstacle to this evolution: political corruption.” based on the Stanford University diploma paper, graded A+. The preface of the book is signed by Larry Diamond, and the afterword by Vladimir Tismăneanu.
BURDUJA, Sebastian I., "The Plan for Romania: 7 intellectual revolutions for a country we want to stay in" [1], ISBN 978-606-33-6731-1, October 2020, Ed. Litera, Bucharest.
BURDUJA, Sebastian I., Rodica Milena ZAHARIA, "Romanian Business Leaders’ Perceptions of Business-to-Business Corruption: Leading More Responsible Businesses? ”, Sustainability, Special Issue on CSR and Business Ethics for Sustainable Development, ISSN 2071-1050, 2019
BURDUJA, Sebastian I., Rodica Milena ZAHARIA, “Corruption Perceptions on Business To Business Relations,” XVI OGÓLNOPOLSKI ZJAZD KATEDR EKONOMII, Międzynarodowa Konferencja, Ekonomiczne wyzwania XXI wieku, Polska – Unia Europejska – Świat,
BURDUJA, Sebastian I. “State Formation in Romania: A Successful Story of Nationalism and Centralization, 1848–1864,” European Journal of Interdisciplinary 8 Studies, ISSN 2067-3795, Vol. 10, Issue 2, 2018, pp. 16–24.
BURDUJA, Sebastian I., Marius STOIAN (coord.), Transport and Infrastructure. Concepts and operational tools, Club România Publishing House, 2018, 806 pg., ISBN 978- 606-94561-3-2
BURDUJA, Sebastian I., Marcel IONESCU-HEROIU, “The energy of Romanian cities: challenges and stage opportunities”, in Marius Stoian, Clara Volintiru (ed.), Energy. Concepts and operational tools, Club România Publishing House, 2018, pp. 115–119, ISBN 978-606-94561-0-1
BURDUJA, Sebastian I. “Romania’s Regional Development at the Crossroads: Where to?” Management Strategies, ISSN 2392-8123, 2017, Year X, no. III (37) / 2017, pp. 188–195
IONESCU-HEROIU, Marcel, Sebastian Ioan BURDUJA, Florentina Ana Burlacu, “Improved Prioritization Criteria for Road Infrastructure Projects,” Romanian Journal of Transport Infrastructure, ISSN 2286-2218, 2017, Vol. 5, Issue 2, pp. 10–27
Sebastian I. BURDUJA, “Deconstructing Moral Leadership: Lessons from Endurance in Antarctica,” 5th International Academic Conference on Strategic, Shift! Major Challenges of Today's Economy, Bucharest, Sep. 28–30, 2017, ISBN 978-606-749-269- 9, 159–171, ISI proceedings
BURDUJA, Sebastian I. “Reach Higher In Higher Education: What Can Romania Learn from the US Example?”, Research & Education – Romanian Research and Education Models, ISSN 2559-2033, 2017, vol.1, no. 1, pp. 2–10
BURDUJA, Sebastian I., “Ethics in Business-to-Business Relations: a Literature Review,” 2nd International e-conference – Enterprises in the Global Economy 2017, Ovidius University Constanta, Fac Econ Sci; Bucharest Univ Econ Studies, Szczecin Univ Romanian Amer Univ, Cape Peninsula Univ, June 21, 2017, 21–27, ISBN 978-88- 95922-97-3, ISI proceedings
BURDUJA, Sebastian I., “Cities for people: the keystone of Romania's development”, in Vasile Iuga, Mihaela Nicola, Răsvan Radu (eds.), Transatlantic Romania, Bucharest, 2016
BURDUJA, Sebastian I., “The strategic triangle of the Romanian public administration”, RO3D – Romania: Democracy, Development, Dignity, Grafoart, Bucharest, 2015
BURDUJA, Sebastian I., Marcel IONESCU-HEROIU, Marius CRISTEA and others, Harmonization of Selection Criteria for Enhanced Coordination and Prioritization of EU and State-Funded Projects, World Bank, 2015
CZAPSKI, Radoslaw et al., Evaluation of the Portfolio of Regional Development Projects, World Bank, 2015
ONESCU-HEROIU, Marcel, Sebastian BURDUJA, Marius CRISTEA and others, Investment Guide for Local Projects: Communal Roads and Social Infrastructure, World Bank, 2015
IONESCU-HEROIU, Marcel, Sebastian BURDUJA, Marius CRISTEA and others, Investment 9 Guide for Local Projects: Water and Wastewater Projects, World Bank, 2015
IONESCU-HEROIU, Marcel, Sebastian BURDUJA, Marius CRISTEA and others, Investment Guide for County Roads, World Bank, 2015
BURDUJA, Sebastian I., Marcel IONESCU-HEROIU, Manuela MOT and others, Coordination of Strategies and Programs for EU and State-Funded Investments in Romania’s Infrastructure, World Bank, 2015
CZAPSKI, Radoslaw et al., Efficient and Innovative Designs and Technologies for Public Infrastructure Investments in Romania, World Bank, 2015
BURDUJA, Sebastian I., “Beyond (dis) illusions: Opportunities in the fight against corruption through the private sector in Romania”, in Dan Dungaciu, Vasile Iuga, Marius Stoian (eds.), 7 Fundamental Themes for Romania, Rao Publishing House, Bucharest, 2014
MARTEAU, Jean-Francois, Marcel IONESCU-HEROIU, Sebastian BURDUJA and others, Improved Prioritization Criteria for PNDL Projects, World Bank, 2014
BURDUJA, Sebastian I., Marcel IONESCU-HEROIU and others, Identification of Project Selection Models for the Regional Operational Program 2014–2020, World Bank, 2014
BOSE, Ranjan and others, Improving Energy Efficiency – Reports on Ploiești, Craiova, Iași, Timișoara, Cluj-Napoca, Brașov, and Constanța, World Bank, 2013
BURDUJA, Sebastian I., Marcel IONESCU-HEROIU, Florian GAMAN and others, Romania’s Regional Operational Program 2.0: Managing Authority and Intermediate Bodies Collaboration and Communication, World Bank, 2013
BURDUJA, Sebastian I., Marcel IONESCU-HEROIU, Florian GAMAN and others, Romania’s Regional Operational Program 2

Professional affiliations
He is Honorary President and founder of the League of Romanian Students Abroad (LSRS) and a founding member of the CAESAR Foundation (Center for Access to the Expertise of Romanian Students and Graduates). He is a member of the Washington D.C. branch. of Global Shapers, a community developed by the World Economic Forum for young people with great potential to be leaders in society. In 2017, he was selected by the JCI organization among the 10 most valuable young people in Romania. In 2018, he was selected as a Millennium Fellow by the Atlantic Council. In 2019, he was selected by the German Marshall Fund as the Marshall Memorial Fellow, a program dedicated to high-potential leaders in Europe and the United States, with Emmanuel Macron and Federica Mogherini.

References

Living people
1985 births
National Liberal Party (Romania) politicians
Members of the Chamber of Deputies (Romania)
Members of the Romanian Cabinet
Politicians from Bucharest
Stanford University alumni
Harvard Business School alumni
Harvard Kennedy School alumni